.ml is the Internet country code top-level domain (ccTLD) for Mali.

History 
The domain was initially managed by Sotelma, a Malian telecommunications company. After Sotelma was privatised in 2009, the .ml zone was redelegated by IANA to the Agence des Technologies de l’Information et de la Communication (AGETIC), a Malian government agency, and the process completed in 2013. The agency then announced that it would give away .ml domains for free with a view to improve the usage and the knowledge of the IT industry in Mali. It is the first African nation to start giving away domains for free.

Second-level domains 
Registrations are at the third level beneath these names:

 .net.ml: Internet providers
 .org.ml: Associations (must show registration); international organizations permitted, but must be registered with the local administration
 .edu.ml: Local schools
 .gov.ml: Governmental organisations
 .presse.ml: Local press

References

External links 
 IANA .ml whois information
 The .ml registry

Country code top-level domains
Communications in Mali
Internet in Mali

sv:Toppdomän#M